is a Japanese volleyball player. He plays in V.League 1 for Panasonic Panthers and Japan's national team.

Personal life 
Otake's older sister, Riho Otake, and father, Hideyuki Otake, are also national volleyball players.

Clubs 
  Chuo University (2014–2017)
  United Volleys Rhein-Main (2017–2018)
  Panasonic Panthers (2018–present)

Awards

Individual 
 2022 AVC Cup – Best Opposite Spiker

References

1995 births
Living people
Japanese men's volleyball players
Sportspeople from Kanagawa Prefecture
Chuo University alumni
Opposite hitters
21st-century Japanese people